Setocampanula is a fungal genus in the family Trichosphaeriaceae. This is a monotypic genus, containing the single species Setocampanula taiwanensis.

References

Trichosphaeriales
Monotypic Sordariomycetes genera
Fungi of Asia